Moonlight on the Prairie is a 1935 American Western film directed by D. Ross Lederman. It was the first of a Warner Bros. singing cowboy film series with Dick Foran and his Palomino Smoke. A print is preserved in the Library of Congress collection.

Plot summary

Cast
 Dick Foran as Ace Andrews (as Dick Foran the Singing Cowboy)
 Smoke as Smoke - Ace Andrews' Horse (as Smoky)
 Sheila Bromley as Barbara Roberts (as Sheila Mannors)
 George E. Stone as Small Change
 Joe Sawyer as Luke Thomas
 Joe King as Sheriff Jim (as Joseph King)
 Robert Barrat as Buck Cantrell
 Dickie Jones as Dickie Roberts
 Bill Elliott as Jeff Holt (as Gordon Elliott)
 Herbert Heywood as Pop Powell
 Raymond Brown as Stage agent
 Richard Carle as Colonel Gowdy (scenes deleted)
 Milton Kibbee as Henchman Pete (as Milt Kibbee)

References

External links
 
 
 
 

1935 films
1935 Western (genre) films
American Western (genre) films
1930s English-language films
American black-and-white films
Films directed by D. Ross Lederman
Warner Bros. films
1930s American films